The 1949 Kilkenny Senior Hurling Championship was the 55th staging of the Kilkenny Senior Hurling Championship since its establishment by the Kilkenny County Board.

Graigue won the championship after a 3-12 to 2-14 defeat of Tullaroan in the final. It was their first ever championship title.

Results

Final

References

Kilkenny Senior Hurling Championship
Kilkenny Senior Hurling Championship